Hardens is a historic home and farm located near Lamptie Hill, Charles City County, Virginia. The main house is a -story, single-pile house, a typical example of mid-19th century Virginia vernacular architecture.  The original section was built about 1845–1846, and expanded about 1849.  It has a gable roof with dormers and features a one-story porch with turned posts and a flat roof. Contributing buildings and structures include a former kitchen, two-story tenant house, and a variety of barns and sheds. During the American Civil War Hardens was used as a Union communications station and was later a camp for General Philip Sheridan.

It was added to the National Register of Historic Places in 1983.

References 

Houses on the National Register of Historic Places in Virginia
Farms on the National Register of Historic Places in Virginia
Houses completed in 1849
Houses in Charles City County, Virginia
National Register of Historic Places in Charles City County, Virginia
1849 establishments in Virginia